Michael Pritchard may refer to:
 Mike Pritchard (born 1969), American football player
Michael Pritchard (philosopher), American philosopher
 Mike Dirnt (Michael Pritchard, born 1972),  American musician
 Michael Pritchard (comedian) (born 1949 or 1950), American comedian, youth counselor, and advocate of social emotional learning
 Michael Pritchard, British developer of the LifeSaver bottle